Schleusingen is a town in the district of Hildburghausen, in Thuringia, Germany. It is situated 10 km north of Hildburghausen, and 12 km southeast of Suhl.

Geography 

The town of Schleusingen in the Henneberger Land got its name from the river Schleuse, which passes through its town districts Ratscher and Rappelsdorf. The town itself is located on the river Nahe, a tributary of the Schleuse, which runs south of the core town area. From the north, from Erlau, the river Erle joins the Nahe in Schleusingen.

Subdivisions 
The town of Schleusingen includes next to the core town another seventeen districts: Altendambach, Breitenbach, Erlau, Fischbach, Geisenhöhn, Gethles, Gottfriedsberg, Heckengereuth, Hirschbach, Hinternah, Oberrod, Rappelsdorf, Ratscher, Schleusingerneundorf, Silbach, Sankt Kilian and Waldau

In addition, terms for residential areas such as' 'Upper-' 'and' 'Lower Town, Schmuckplatz, Weißer Berg, Hirtengrund, Kalkrangen, Sonneneck, Rubetal ' etc. are common in the population.

History

Schleusingen was first mentioned in documents in 1232 as 'Villa Slusungen'. Earl Poppo VII of Henneberg built as a residence and fortification in the period from 1226 to 1232 the Bertholdsburg. 1274 was the division of the Shire Henneberg into three lines. The Bertholdsburg then became the residence of the Schleusinger line of the Earls of Henneberg. 
Schleusingen experienced a first fire catastrophe in the year 1353. Further town fires in 1679, 1765, 1773 and 1876 destroyed whole districts of the town.

In 1412 Schleusingen received the Stadtrecht (the right to be considered a town) but only in 1533 the Marktrecht (the right to, among other things, hold a folk festival or a weekly market). In 1502 Earl Wilhelm IV. founded a Barfüsserkloster (monastery) in the outskirts. During the riots in the German Peasants' War in the spring of 1525, the inhabitants, documents and valuables of the neighboring monasteries Veßra and Trostadt were sent to Schleusingen to be brought to safety at the Bertholdsburg. In 1544 the Reformation was introduced. The Aegidienkapelle of the St. Johannis Church became the burial place of the Earls of Henneberg in 1566 and of Elisabeth of Brandenburg. The Barfüsserkloster was transferred into state ownership and from 1560 it was used as a school.  On 7 June 1577 this school was inaugurated on as a Gymnasium (high school) and still exists today under the name Hennebergisches Gymnasium 'Georg Ernst']. Until 1583 Schleusingen was the seat of the Earls of Henneberg. After the death of Earl Georg Ernst), with whose death the royal line was extinguished, Schleusingen was transferred to the Saxon dukes of the Ernestine and the Albertiner line, at first under joined administration. From 1500 to 1806 Schleusingen belonged to the Franconian Imperial Circle.

Incorporations 
 Fischbach on 1 March 1970
 Geisenhöhn and Gottfriedsberg on 1 April 1974
 Gethles, Ratscher and Heckengereuth on 22 February 1994
 Rappelsdorf on 1 June 1996
 Nahetal-Waldau and Sankt Kilian on 6 July 2018

Population Development 
 
Population development '(from 1960 on 31 December respectively)' ':

Main sights 

 Castle Bertholdsburg
 Townchurch St. Johannis
 Teutsche Schule
 market place

References

Hildburghausen (district)